The Commission de Surveillance du Secteur Financier (CSSF) is responsible for the financial regulation in Luxembourg. The CSSF is responsible for the supervision of credit institutions, experts in the financial sector, investment companies, pension funds, regulated securities markets and their operators, multilateral trading facilities and payment institutions. The CSSF is the competent authority for the public auditor oversight.

History 
The CSSF took over the duties of the former Commissariat aux Bourses and of the Institut Monétaire Luxembourgeois (IML), which on 1 June 1998, became the Banque centrale du Luxembourg (BCL).

Structure

General organisation 
Beside the Executive board, the CSSF consists of:

 Executive Board secretariat
 General secretariat
 PFS application guidance and regulation
 Legal department
 On-site inspection
 Public oversight of the audit profession
 Accounting, auditing and transparency
 UCI departments
 Supervision of specialised PFS
 Supervision of banks
 Singe Supervisory Mechanism (SSM)
 Depositor and Investor Protection
 Supervision of securities markets departments
 Supervision of investment firms
 Innovation, payments, markets infrastructures and governance
 Supervision of information systems and support PFS
 Personnel, administration and finance
 Information systems of the CSSF (IT)
 Resolution

Responsibilities

Supervision 
The CSSF supervision of the financial sector aims at:
 Promotion of a considered and prudent business policy in accordance with regulatory requirements
 Protection of the financial stability of the regulated entities and the financial sector as a whole
 Monitoring the quality of the organizational and internal control systems
 Strengthening the quality of risk management
The CSSF monitors all financial activities in Luxembourg requiring the approval of the Minister responsible for the CSSF. It believes that it is in the public interest to ensure (a) that the laws and ordinances are enforced on the financial sector and (b) that international conventions and EU directives in the areas under its responsibility are implemented. The CSSF is authorized to demand all information needed to perform its duties from the companies under its supervision. The CSSF takes care of negotiations about the financial sector and coordinates the implementation of government measures whenever there is an expansion of the activities of the financial sector at local or international level.

Public auditor oversight 
The CSSF is the public auditor oversight. In this regard, the CSSF is thus responsible for the granting of the professional qualifications of the "Independent Auditor" (auditors) and "cabinet de Revision" (audit) for the approval and registration of statutory auditors and audit firms. The CSSF is also responsible for the implementation of auditing standards and professional ethical standards and internal quality control of audit firms and approvals for continuing education.

Investor protection 
The CSSF is directly responsible for investor protection related queries. As part of the FIN-NET program, the CSSF is the sole recourse for investors who seek compensation or handling of complaints.  Unlike some jurisdictions, there is no separate or independent ombudsman.  There have been a number of high-profile cases, including Madoff, where the CSSF's ability to handle customer complaints has come into question.  To date, the general response has been unsatisfactory and there are increasing concerns over the capabilities of the CSSF to carry out their duties effectively. With a prime role to market the financial sector, a direct conflict is often observed between protecting investors and regulating/promoting an orderly financial market. LuxAlpha (Madoff), Landsbanki, and others have failed to recover any investor monies, despite investor outcry and complaints. In the matter of LFP I SICAV, the directors launched a gross negligence civil complaint against the CSSF in October 2020, holding them responsible for €100 million of losses in 4 sub-funds identified as Ponzi schemes.

Anti-Money Laundering and Countering the Financing of Terrorism (AML/CTF)
Within the framework of its statutory mission, the CSSF is in charge of ensuring that all the persons subject to its supervision, authorization, or registration comply with the professional AML/CTF obligations. However, recent disclosure about Director General Claude Marx being cited in the Panama Papers as having a key involvement in over 100 offshore companies whilst at HSBC Private Bank, as well as the CSSF's poor track record in addressing AML complaints, have served to undermine its credibility as an AML enforcer.

References

External links 

Financial regulatory authorities of Luxembourg
Securities and exchange commissions
Government agencies of Luxembourg